"B.Y.O.B." ("Bring Your Own Bombs") is a song by Armenian-American heavy metal band System of a Down. It was released in March 2005 as the lead single from their fourth album Mezmerize. Like their earlier song "Boom!", it was written in protest against the Iraq War. The song reached number 27 on the US Billboard Hot 100, the band's highest peak to date on the chart.

Music video
Directed by Jake Nava, the music video for "B.Y.O.B." shows an army of soldiers marching through the streets, wearing paintball masks with television screens projecting words like "DIE", "TRUTH", "OBEY", "BUY" or "GOD", with the band members playing in the middle of the street. During the chorus, the band is shown playing inside a night club. Midway through the video, co-lead vocalist Daron Malakian is shown screaming the words "Blast off! It's party time! And we don't live in a fascist nation! Blast off! It's party time! And where the fuck are you?!", when the soldiers storm the night club and force everyone to put on the drone masks, during which the masks show images of television shows and war. At the end of the video, the band members are shown wearing the drone masks, which are playing static.

As of January 2023, the song has over 417 million views on YouTube.

Songwriting legal case
Casey Chaos claimed to have helped write the song in 2002, and Malakian offered to gift him a 2% royalties credit. When Chaos asked for more, the offer was rescinded. Casey Chaos then subsequently sold a 50% interest in the song to Maxwood Music Ltd. However, in 2010 a Manhattan court ruled Malakian and Tankian to be the sole writers of the song.

Accolades
B.Y.O.B. won the "Best Hard Rock Performance" category in the 2006 Grammy Awards.

Track listing
CD single

 The live tracks were recorded at the Big Day Out 2005 festival.

Digital download [First version]

7" single • digital download [Second version]

Personnel

System of a Down
 Serj Tankian – vocals, keyboards
 Daron Malakian – vocals, guitars, bass (uncredited)
 Shavo Odadjian – bass (credited but does not perform)
 John Dolmayan – drums, percussion

Vocals
 "Soldier Side" - Intro: Daron Malakian and Serj Tankian (both main)
 "B.Y.O.B.": Tankian (main), Malakian (second voice)
 "Revenga": Tankian (main), Malakian (second voice)
 "Cigaro": Tankian (main), Malakian (second voice)
 "Radio/Video": Malakian and Tankian (both main)
 "This Cocaine Makes Me Feel Like I'm on this Song": Tankian
 "Violent Pornography": Malakian and Tankian (both main)
 "Question!": Tankian (main), Malakian (backing vocals)
 "Sad Statue": Malakian and Tankian (both main)
 "Old School Hollywood": Malakian and Tankian (both main)
 "Lost in Hollywood": Malakian (main) and Tankian (second voice)

Production
 Rick Rubin – production
 Andy Wallace – mixing
 David Schiffman – engineering
 Jason Lader – editing
 Dana Neilsen – editing
 Phillip Broussard – engineering assistance
 John O'Mahony – Pro Tools engineering
 Steve Sisco – mixing assistance
 Joe Peluso – mixing assistance

Additional personnel
 Marc Mann – string arrangements
 Vartan Malakian – artwork
 Brandy Flower – graphic design

Chart positions

Certifications

See also
List of anti-war songs

References

External links
 Listen to B.Y.O.B. at the band's official website

2005 singles
Anti-war songs
System of a Down songs
Songs of the Iraq War
Music videos directed by Jake Nava
Song recordings produced by Rick Rubin
Grammy Award for Best Hard Rock Performance
Songs written by Daron Malakian
Songs written by Serj Tankian
Columbia Records singles
Thrash metal songs